Richard Ronald Fancy (born August 2, 1943) is an American actor and comedian known for his long recurring role on Seinfeld as publisher Mr. Lippman, Elaine Benes's employer.

Early life 
Fancy was born August 2, 1943, in Evanston, Illinois, to salesman Raymond Chester Fancy and a radio performer mother. Fancy is named after his paternal grandmother, Magdelene Richard.

Career 
Fancy appeared on the third and fourth seasons of It's Garry Shandling's Show as network boss Mr. Stravely. He also plays the priest in the 1991 film What About Bob? and was Kevin Arnold's high school principal, Dr. Valenti, in the fourth and fifth seasons of The Wonder Years. He also appeared in Oliver Stone's Nixon (1995) and Primal Force (1999). He played Sector Control in the Sliders episode "Please Press One."

He had two memorable appearances in late 2005 on Boston Legal, as a crooked Catholic priest; as mob financier Bernie Abrahms on General Hospital (2006–2012), (and also as his brother, Bennie, from 1997 to 2003); and as Capt. Satelk in the Star Trek: The Next Generation episode "The First Duty".

Personal life
Fancy is married to Joanna Fass, the daughter of screenwriters George and Gertrude Fass; they have two children.

Filmography

Film

Television

References

External links
 

1943 births
American male film actors
American male television actors
Living people
Male actors from Evanston, Illinois
American male soap opera actors